T21 may refer to:

Aircraft 
 Junkers T.21, a German reconnaissance aircraft produced in the Soviet Union
 Slingsby T.21, a British training glider

Rail and transit 
 Minami-morimachi Station, in Kita-ku, Osaka, Japan
 Myōden Station, in Ichikawa, Chiba, Japan
 SJ T21, a Swedish locomotive
 Yakuriguchi Station, in Takamatsu, Kagawa Prefecture, Japan

Ships and boats 
 , a tank landing ship of the Venezuelan Navy
 
 Mistral T-21, a Canadian sailboat

Other uses 
 T21 (rocket), an American chemical warfare rocket
 Down syndrome, or trisomy 21
 Estonian national road 21
 T21 Light Tank, an American light tank
 ThinkPad T21, a notebook computer
 Trisomie 21, a French cold wave group